The Fearless Four may refer to:

 The Fearless Four (group), an American old school hip-hop group
 The Fearless Four (film), a 1997 animated film
 The Fearless Four, a children's book series by John Hare